Jeshnian or Jeshneyan or Jashneyan or  Jesniyan or Joshnian may refer to:
 Jeshnian, Bavanat
 Jeshnian, Marvdasht